Cool Britannia was a name for the period of increased pride in the culture of the United Kingdom throughout the mid and second half of the 1990s, inspired by Swinging London from 1960s pop culture. This loosely coincided with John Major's conservative government and the 1997 United Kingdom general election where Tony Blair's New Labour government won in a landslide. The success of Britpop and musical acts such as the Spice Girls, Blur, and Oasis led to a renewed feeling of optimism in the United Kingdom following the tumultuous years of the 1970s and 1980s. The name is a pun on the title of the British patriotic song "Rule, Britannia!"

Origins of the term

Etymology 
The phrase "Cool Britannia" was coined in 1967 as a song title by the Bonzo Dog Doo Dah Band (specifically, the first song in their debut album Gorilla) and contained the lyrics, which referenced the song "Rule Britannia!": "Cool Britannia, Britannia you are cool/Take a trip!/Britons ever, ever, ever shall be hip." The phrase "Cool Britannia" reappeared in early 1996 as a registered trade mark for one of Ben & Jerry's ice cream flavours which mixed vanilla, strawberries and "fudge-covered shortbread". Channel 4 had a magazine show called "Cool Britannia" in 1996 and 1997.

Media use of the term 
According to American journalist Stryker McGuire, the "Cool Britannia" term started to become prominent in the 1990s as a shorthand metaphor to reflect the British economic rise during the decade. In 1996, McGuire wrote cover story for Newsweek attributing this rapid economic development to the Thatcherite policies of the 1980s, titled "London Rules". In the article, London (which had been one of the most heavily impacted cities by the recent economic developments) was proclaimed by Newsweek to be "the coolest city on the planet." Though McGuire had never used the phrase "Cool Britannia", he noted in a 2009 Guardian article that the Newsweek story use of the word 'cool' "launched a thousand "Cool Britannia" ships." 

The election of Tony Blair in 1997 marked a change in tone from the previous Prime Minister, John Major. Blair, who liked to draw attention during his election campaign that he had been in a punk band called Ugly Rumours while in university, invited high-profile musicians to 10 Downing Street for photo opportunities.

General characteristics

Time described "Cool Britannia" as the mid-1990s celebration of youth culture in the UK. To the extent that it had any real meaning, "Cool Britannia" referred to the transient fashionable London house scene: clubs included the Ministry of Sound and the underground Megatripolis at Heaven, 1990s bands such as Blur and Oasis, fashion designers, the Young British Artists and magazines. Cool Britannia also summed up the mood in Britain during the mid-1990s Britpop movement, when there was a resurgence of distinctive British rock and pop music from bands such as Oasis, Blur, Pulp, Suede, Supergrass, and Elastica. Although they do not fall under the Britpop genre, pop girl group the Spice Girls were also part of the movement, with Time calling them "arguably the most recognizable face" of Cool Britannia.

The renewal in British pride was symbolised in imagery such as Noel Gallagher's Union Jack guitar and Geri Halliwell's Union Jack dress, worn at the 1997 Brit Awards. The Euro 1996 football tournament, hosted in England, is also considered an event that encouraged a resurgence of patriotism, particularly in England. John Major, who was prime minister of Britain at the time, famously took credit (November 1996), accompanied with a press release issued by the Department of National Heritage: "Our fashion, music and culture are the envy of our European neighbours. This abundance of talent, together with our rich heritage, makes 'Cool Britannia' an obvious choice for visitors from all over the world." With his high-profile bouts, world featherweight champion boxer ”Prince” Naseem Hamed is also associated with the era, as are alcopops and Lads' Magazines.

Released in 1994, romantic comedy film Four Weddings and a Funeral, featuring one of the era's biggest stars, Hugh Grant, had been an early portent of the new wave of British cinema. Devised by screenwriter Richard Curtis, it set a pattern for British-set romantic comedies, including Sliding Doors (1998) and Notting Hill (1999), the latter also starring Grant. The first Austin Powers film, International Man of Mystery, co-starring Elizabeth Hurley (who was in a high-profile relationship with Grant), was released in 1997, and with its Cool Britannia influenced take on the Swinging London era it instantly included itself in the same 1990s cultural moment. Danny Boyle’s 1996 film Trainspotting featured a Britpop-heavy soundtrack.

In March 1997 Vanity Fair published a special edition on Cool Britannia with Liam Gallagher and Patsy Kensit on the cover; the title read 'London Swings! Again!'. Figures in the issues included Alexander McQueen, Damien Hirst, Graham Coxon and the editorial staff of Loaded. Tony Blair’s speech at the 1996 Labour party conference drew on the optimism of the Euro 96 football championships – accompanied with the summer’s chart-topping anthem “Three Lions”. Alluding to the "thirty years of hurt" lyric in the song (since England last won the World Cup), Blair stated, "Seventeen years of hurt never stopped us dreaming. Labour’s coming home." After the Labour party won its landslide, there was even more enthusiasm.

During this however The Economist was commenting that "many people are already sick of the phrase", and senior Labour politicians, such as Foreign Secretary Robin Cook, seemed embarrassed by its usage. By 2000 (after the decline of Britpop as a tangible genre) it was being used mainly in a mocking or ironic way.

Two highlight DVDs, Later... With Jools Holland: Cool Britannia 1 & 2, have appeared since 2004. Similar terms have been used regionally for similar phenomena; in Wales and Scotland, "Cool Cymru" and "Cool Caledonia", respectively, have been used.

See also

 British Invasion
:
Cool Cymru
 Cool Japan
 Korean Wave
 Taiwanese Wave

References

External links 
 "Whatever happened to Cool Britannia ? The UK after eight years of Blair", Cerium, May 2005. Links to papers and video.
 "Cool Britannia: where did it all go wrong?", The New Statesman, 1 May 2017
 "Cool Britannia symbolised hope – but all it delivered was a culture of inequality", The Guardian, 5 July 2017

British culture
Cool Cymru
1990s fads and trends
1990s in the United Kingdom
1960s neologisms
Britannia
Youth culture in the United Kingdom
Patriotism